Kentucky Route 770 (KY 770) is an east–west rural secondary state highway located entirely in Laurel County in southeastern Kentucky.

Route description 
KY 770 connects KY 312 to the Interstate 75/U.S. Route 25E junction at the interstate's Exit 29 interchange.

References

0770
0770